Santomean cuisine comprises the cuisine, dishes and foods of São Tomé and Príncipe, a Portuguese-speaking island nation in the Gulf of Guinea, off the western equatorial coast of Central Africa.

Overview
Domestic food-crop production is inadequate to meet local consumption, so the country imports much of its food. In 1997, it was estimated that 90 percent of the country's food needs were met through imports. Furthermore, the country is not self-sufficient in meat and food-grain production, and is reliant upon imports of these foods. In 2003, it was estimated that 8.33% of the country's total land is arable.

Primary food crops include bananas, breadfruit, taro, maize, beans, papaya, palm oil, and primary agricultural production crops for export include cocoa, copra and coffee. Fish and seafood is prominent in São Tomése and Príncipe cuisine, and the fishing industry contributes approximately 25 percent to the country's gross domestic product. Poultry is also raised in São Tomé and Príncipe.

The nation's cuisine has been influenced and shaped by African and Portuguese settlers.

Common foods
Staple foods include fish, seafood, beans, maize and cooked banana. Tropical fruits such as pineapple, avocado and bananas are a significant component of the cuisine. The use of hot spices is prominent in São Tomése cuisine. Coffee is utilized in various dishes as a spice or seasoning. Breakfast dishes are often reheated leftovers from the previous evening's meal.

Arroz doce is a traditional breakfast food prepared with sweet corn and coconut
 Banana pap is a porridge
 Barriga de peixe is a traditional Santomean dish of grilled fish served with rice, breadfruit or manioc (cassava)
 Blablá
 Broa—cornmeal and rye bread
 Cachupa is a dish prepared with green beans, broad beans and corn.
 Calulu is a traditional dish prepared with grouper or smoked fish, prawns, tomato, okra, aubergines (eggplant), onion, and spices, including grains of paradise. Some versions of the dish may include or use smoked chicken, breadfruit,  óssame (a red, bulbous fruit) or bananas. It takes around five hours for traditional calulu to be prepared.
 Chicken
 Chicken with coffee sauce is prepared with chicken, coffee, white wine, cream, garlic, coffee beans and spices
 Coconut
 Djogo 
 Flying fish, both cooked and dried varieties
 Jackfruit
 Mango
 Omelettes 
 Boiled pork is a dish prepared with pork, tomato, spinach, onion, garlic and spices

Beverages

 Carioca de limão is prepared with lemon peel and hot water.
 Coconut water
 Coffee
 Soft drinks 
 Tea

Alcoholic beverages
 Aquardente is a distilled beverage prepared from sugar cane.
 Nacional is the country's national beer. Other beers, such as Super Bock and Sagres lager are imported from Portugal. Criollo is another brand of beer produced in the country.
 Gravana rum is prepared from sugar cane.
 Palm wine is considered a national drink of São Tomé and Príncipe.
 Ponche is a cocktail prepared with honey and Aquardente.
 Wines, typically imported from Portugal

Street foods

Street foods include stews, safú (a fruit) and corn on the cob.

Delicacies
Estufa de morcego is a bat stew delicacy that is served on saints days and during fiestas.

Desserts and sweets
 Açucarinhas are prepared from coconut and sugar, formed into patties, and fried in palm oil.
 Aranha is prepared with coconut, sugar strings and food coloring.
 Canjica is a porridge that is prepared with canjica maize kernels, egg, sugar, cinnamon and water.
 Chocolate
 Chocolate mousse

Snack foods
 Banana seca is a dried, whole banana that has a smoky flavor.
 Bobofrito is a specialty of Príncipe that consists of bananas fried in coconut oil.
 Bread rolls with Portuguese salami and sausages
 Fios is a snack food prepared with corn flour and bananas.
 Gigumba (peanut brittle) 
 Palla-palla are crisps prepared with cocoyam or banana.

Condiments
 Piri-piri sauce prepared with malagueta pepper is commonly available in Santomean restaurants.

See also

 African cuisine
 Economy of São Tomé and Príncipe
 List of African cuisines
 List of African dishes

References

Further reading
 
 
 Democratic Republic of Sao Tome and Principe: Request for a Three-Year Arrangement Under the Poverty Reduction and Growth Facility. International Monetary Fund. pp. 4–5.

External links

 
São Tomé and Príncipe culture
Sao Tome And Principe